Protaras (Greek: Πρωταράς) is a predominantly tourist resort which comes under the administrative jurisdiction of Paralimni Municipality in Cyprus. In ancient times, where Protaras is now located, stood the old city-state of Leukolla. The city possessed a small safe harbour where Demetrius Poliorketes sought refuge in the year 306 BC, lying in wait for Ptolemy, one of the successors of Alexander the Great. In the ensuing battle, Ptolemy was defeated and fled to Egypt, leaving Cyprus in the hands of Demetrius for a short time. Protaras is also referred to as "the land of windmills", maintaining the nostalgic quality of the past.

Protaras has clear sky-blue waters and sandy beaches, the most well-known of which is Fig Tree Bay. Being quieter than Ayia Napa and having less of a club scene, it has a reputation of catering more for family and Cypriot tourism. Cape Greco is a 10-minute drive from the center of Protaras.

Protaras is a diving destination. Green Bay is the most popular dive site and has statues placed underwater for the thousands of first timers to enjoy while trying their scuba skills. The Blue Hole, the Chapel, the Decosta Bay, Malama bay. Protaras most famous dive site for Technical Diving and Commercial Diver training is the Cyclops bay located on the border with Ayia Napa.

References

Paralimni